War Pigs is a 2015 American action war film directed by Ryan Little and starring Luke Goss, Dolph Lundgren, Chuck Liddell, and Mickey Rourke.

Plot
Disgraced World War II United States Army Captain Jack Wosick is given the opportunity for redemption when asked to lead a rag-tag unit of misfits known as the War Pigs on a secret mission to go behind enemy lines to gather intelligence on a Nazi developed Super Weapon the V-3, a massive artillery cannon which would give the Nazis an insurmountable advantage against the Allies. With the help of Captain Hans Picault, a German anti-Nazi serving with the French Foreign Legion and Colonel A.J. Redding, a battle hardened WW1 veteran, Jack must train, lead and earn the respect of his new squad to become a functioning reconnaissance unit.

Cast

 Luke Goss as Captain/1st Lieutenant/Captain Jack Wosick
 Dolph Lundgren as Captain Hans Picault
 Chuck Liddell as Sergeant McGreevy
 Mickey Rourke as Colonel A.J. Redding
 Noah Segan as Private/Corporal August Chambers
 Steven Luke as Preacher
 Ryan Kelley as Private William York
 Jake Stormoen as Private Frenchy Buckle
 K.C. Clyde as Private Moffatte

References

External links
 
 

2015 films
Western Front of World War II films
World War II films based on actual events
American war films
2010s English-language films
Films directed by Ryan Little
2010s American films